Andrew O'Hagan  (born 1968) is a Scottish novelist and non-fiction author. Three of his novels have been nominated for the Booker Prize and he has won several awards, including the Los Angeles Times Book Award.

His most recent novel  is Mayflies (2020), which won the Christopher Isherwood Prize.

Early life and education
O'Hagan was born in Glasgow city centre in 1968, of Irish Catholic descent, and grew up in Kilwinning, North Ayrshire. His mother was a school cleaner, his father worked as a joiner in Paisley, and he had four elder brothers. His father was a violent alcoholic, and as a boy, he would hide books from his father under his bed.

He attended St Winning's Primary then St Michael's Academy before studying at the University of Strathclyde, the first in his family to reach tertiary education. He earned his BA (Honours) in English in 1990.

Writing career
In 1991, O'Hagan joined the staff of the London Review of Books, where he worked for four years.

In 1995, he published his first book, The Missing, which drew from his own childhood and explored the lives of people who have gone missing in Britain and the families left behind. The Missing was shortlisted for three literary awards: the Esquire Award, the Saltire Society Scottish First Book of the Year Award, and the McVities Prize for Scottish Writer of the Year award.

In 1999, his debut novel, Our Fathers was nominated for several awards, including the Booker Prize, the Whitbread First Novel Award and the International Dublin Literary Award. It won the Winifred Holtby Memorial Prize.

In 2003, his next novel Personality, which has close similarities to the life of Lena Zavaroni, won the James Tait Black Memorial Prize for fiction. That same year, O'Hagan won the E. M. Forster Award from the American Academy of Arts and Letters.

In 2006, his third novel, Be Near Me, was published by Faber and Faber and long-listed for that year's Booker Prize. It went on to win the Los Angeles Times'''s 2007 Prize for Fiction. In 2008, he edited a new selection of Robert Burns's poems for Canongate Books, published as A Night Out with Robert Burns. A copy was lodged in every secondary school in Scotland. Following on from this, he wrote and presented a three-part film on Burns for the BBC, The World According to Robert Burns, first on 5 January 2009. In January 2011, Scotland on Sunday gave away 80,000 copies of the book. Also in 2008, Faber & Faber published O'Hagan's first non-fiction collection, The Atlantic Ocean: Essays on Britain and America, which was shortlisted for the 2008 Saltire Book of the Year Award.

His 2010 novel, The Life and Opinions of Maf the Dog, and of His Friend Marilyn Monroe, is told in the voice of a Scottish Maltese poodle ("Maf"), the name of the real dog given by Frank Sinatra to Marilyn Monroe in 1960. It was published by Faber & Faber in May 2010 and won O'Hagan a Glenfiddich Spirit of Scotland Award.

In 2012, O'Hagan worked on a theatrical production about the crisis in British newspapers, entitled Enquirer, with the National Theatre of Scotland.

In March 2014, O'Hagan wrote about his experience as a ghost-writer for Julian Assange's autobiography (published by Canongate and Alfred A. Knopf). His essay, entitled "Ghosting", published in the London Review of Books, gained significant media attention because of his description of Assange's character and strained relationships with past and present colleagues.

In 2015, O'Hagan published his fifth novel The Illuminations: A Novel, which was longlisted for the Booker Prize.

In June 2016, the London Review of Books published a 35,612-word essay by O'Hagan, titled "The Satoshi Affair: Andrew O'Hagan on the many lives of Satoshi Nakamoto", which followed the events surrounding programmer Craig Wright's claim to be bitcoin founder, Satoshi Nakomoto. Though the article is inconclusive as to the true identity of Satoshi, some have taken it as evidence that Wright is a fraud.

In October 2017, O'Hagan published The Secret Life: Three True Stories of the Digital Age that includes stories about his attempt to help Julian Assange write his memoirs, the author using the identity of a deceased man to make a new life on the Internet, and expanding on Craig Wright's claim to be Satoshi Nakamoto.

In September 2020, O'Hagan published his sixth novel, Mayflies.

His essays, reports and stories have appeared in London Review of Books, New York Review of Books, Granta, The Guardian and The New Yorker.

Adaptations
Four of O'Hagan's books have received adaptations into different media. In 1996, Channel 4 Television presented Calling Bible John: Portrait of a Serial Killer, nominated for a BAFTA award. In 2009, his novel Be Near Me was adapted by Ian McDiarmid for the Donmar Warehouse and the National Theatre of Scotland.

In September 2011, the National Theatre of Scotland presented The Missing as a play adapted by O'Hagan and directed by John Tiffany at Tramway, Glasgow. The play received favourable reviews. The Daily Telegraph called it "a profound act of mourning and memory." The Guardian called the work "an arresting, genre-defying work – part speculative memoir, part Orwellian social reportage" that "induces the kind of shock he [the author] must have experienced..."

In December 2022 BBC One showed an adaptation of Mayflies starring Martin Compston, Tony Curran, and Ashley Jensen.

Other activities
In 2001, O'Hagan was named as a Goodwill Ambassador by the UK branch of UNICEF, and he has been involved in fundraising efforts for the organisation. He has travelled to the Sudan, India, Malawi and Mozambique and has joined fellow ambassadors Ewan McGregor, Ralph Fiennes, James Nesbitt, Martin Bell and Jemima Khan in campaigning for Unicef.

In August 2017, O'Hagan gave a speech at The Edinburgh International Book Festival, where he declared that he had become a supporter of Scottish independence.

, O'Hagan has been a visiting professor of creative writing at King's College London.

Recognition, awards and honours
O'Hagan was selected by the literary magazine Granta for inclusion in their 2003 list of the top 20 young British novelists, and his novels have been translated into 15 languages.

Book awards
 1995 – Esquire Award for The Missing (shortlist)
 1995 – McVitie's Prize for Scottish Writer of the Year for The Missing (shortlist)
 1995 – Saltire Society Scottish First Book of the Year Award for The Missing (shortlist)
 1996 – BAFTA, Calling Bible John (TV series, winner)
 1999 – Booker Prize for Our Fathers (shortlist)
 1999 –Whitbread First Novel Award for Our Fathers (shortlist)
 2000 – Mail on Sunday/John Llewellyn Rhys Prize for Our Fathers (shortlist)
 2000 – Winifred Holtby Memorial Prize for Our Fathers (winner)
 2001 – International Dublin Literary Award for Our Fathers (shortlist)
 2003 – James Tait Black Memorial Prize (for fiction), Personality (winner)
 2006 – Los Angeles Times Book Prize (for fiction), Be Near Me (winner)
 2010 – Glenfiddich Spirit of Scotland Award for Writing (winner)
2020 – Christopher Isherwood Prize for Autobiographical Prose (winner)

Other honours and appointments
Trustee of George Orwell Trust
Patron of Scottish Book Trust
2008: Honorary Doctor of Letters, University of Strathclyde
2008: Joined Robert Burns Humanitarian Award judging panel
2009: Honorary lifetime member of Irvine Burns Club
2010: Fellow of the Royal Society of Literature
2019: Named chief judge Scottish Arts Trust Story Awards, succeeding Alexander McCall Smith in that role, on 6 December 2019

Selected works
Fiction books
 Our Fathers, 1999
 Personality, 2003
 Be Near Me, 2006
 The Life and Opinions of Maf the Dog, and of His Friend Marilyn Monroe, 2010
 The Illuminations, 2015
 Mayflies, 2020

Non-fiction books
 The Missing, 1995
 The Atlantic Ocean: Essays, 2008
 The Secret Life: Three True Stories of the Digital Age, 2017

Other writings
 Short stories:  online text from Sunday Times, 7 December 2008
 As a ghostwriter: Julian Assange: The Unauthorised Autobiography, 2011
 Editing:New Writing 11, 2002
 The Weekenders: Adventures in Calcutta, 2004
 A Night Out with Robert Burns, 2008
 Book Reviews:
"Racing against reality" The New York Review of Books 54/11 (28 June 2007): 4–8 [review of Don DeLillo, Falling Man]
 "Run" Publishers Weekly Fiction Reviews: Week of 16 July 2007. Review of Run by Ann Patchett.
 The Satoshi Affair: Andrew O’Hagan on the many lives of Satoshi Nakamoto (2016, non-fiction)
 "Ghosting" London Review of Books, 6 March 2014
 The Tower, a 60,000-word essay about the Grenfell Tower fire in The London Review of Books''

References

Further reading
 Profile at the Contemporary Writers website, including a critical assessment
 O'Hagan at the 2004 Republican National Convention: an article printed in the LRB
 Andrew O'Hagan interviewed with CBC Radio One's Eleanor Wachtel
Video: Andrew O'Hagan on writing, reading and drinking in Scotland on Scottish Book Trust
http://www.abc.net.au/radionational/programs/bestoffestivals/andrew-o'hagan-in-conversation/8054660

External links

1968 births
Date of birth missing (living people)
Living people
20th-century British male writers
20th-century Scottish novelists
21st-century British male writers
21st-century Scottish novelists
Alumni of the University of Strathclyde
Fellows of the Royal Society of Literature
Granta people
James Tait Black Memorial Prize recipients
People from Kilwinning
Scottish journalists
Scottish literary critics
Scottish magazine editors
Scottish male novelists
Scottish people of Irish descent
Scottish Roman Catholics
Writers from Glasgow